

Otto Lancelle (27 March 1885 – 3 July 1941) was a German general in the Wehrmacht during World War II and a recipient of both the Pour le Mérite and Knight's Cross of the Iron Cross, the highest military awards of German Empire and Nazi Germany, respectively. 

Lancelle was killed by a sniper on 3 July 1941 at the Krāslava Bridgehead on the Daugava near Krāslava, Latvia. He was the first German general, who was killed in (de facto) Soviet territory after the attack on the Soviet Union. He was posthumously promoted to Generalleutnant and awarded the Knight's Cross.

Lancelle was first buried next to the Krāslava Lutheran Church, and later reinterred in Garmisch-Partenkirchen. The Polish town of Rzgów was renamed Lancellenstätt in his honor by the occupiers from 1943 to 1945. A memorial marker on the site of his death was installed by his son Kraft in July 1994, which was removed by authorities in November 2022.

Awards and decorations

 Pour le Mérite (9 October 1918)

 Knight's Cross of the Iron Cross on 27 July 1941 (posthumously) as Generalmajor and commander of 121. Infanterie-Division

References

Citations

Bibliography

 

1885 births
1941 deaths
People from Xanten
Lieutenant generals of the German Army (Wehrmacht)
German Army personnel of World War I
Recipients of the Pour le Mérite (military class)
Recipients of the Knight's Cross of the Iron Cross
German Army personnel killed in World War II
People from the Rhine Province
Sturmabteilung officers
Recipients of the clasp to the Iron Cross, 1st class
Deaths by firearm in the Soviet Union
Military personnel from North Rhine-Westphalia